Genkwanin is an O-methylated flavone, a type of flavonoid. It can be found in the seeds of Alnus glutinosa, and the leaves of the ferns Notholaena bryopoda and Asplenium normale  and Aquilaria.

References 

O-methylated flavones